Humaid bin Rashid Al Nuaimi was the Ruler of Ajman, one of the Trucial States which today form the United Arab Emirates (UAE), from 1838–1841, when he was deposed by his brother, Abdelaziz bin Rashid Al Nuaimi. Humaid ruled from Abdelaziz' death in 1848 until his own death in 1864.

Accession 
Humaid acceded following the death of his father, Sheikh Rashid bin Humaid Al Nuaimi. Rashid's eldest son, Ali, was a businessman and had removed himself from day to day involvement in the majlis and had no interest in becoming Ruler. The family nominated Humaid to take the position. He married a daughter of Sheikh Sultan bin Saqr Al Qasimi who was, at the time, Ruler of Sharjah and with whom Humaid was closely allied. In 1841, his brother Abdelaziz took possession of Ajman fort and declared himself Ruler. In 1848  Abdelaziz was killed in a fight with Hamriyah and Humaid, who was also wounded in the conflict, became Ruler once again. 

Humaid was signatory to the Perpetual Maritime Truce with the British, signed on 4 May 1853.

Sheikh Humaid died in 1864 and was succeeded by Sheikh Rashid bin Humaid Al Nuaimi II.

References 

1864 deaths
Sheikhs of the Emirate of Ajman
19th-century monarchs in the Middle East
History of the United Arab Emirates
19th-century Arabs